Curlett is a surname. Notable people with the surname include:

 William and Alexander Curlett, American architects, father and son
 T. Spicer Curlett (1847–1914), American politician